Proslaukha is a rural locality (a selo) and the administrative center of Proslaukhinsky Selsoviet, Bayevsky District, Altai Krai, Russia. The population was 457 as of 2013. There are 10 streets.

Geography 
Proslaukha is located near the Kulunda River 17 km northeast of Bayevo (the district's administrative centre) by road. Kapustinka is the nearest rural locality.

References 

Rural localities in Bayevsky District